KCVE may refer to:

 KCVE-LP (Texas), a radio station (107.3 FM) licensed to serve Conroe, Texas, United States
 KCVE-LP (California), a defunct radio station (92.3 FM) formerly licensed to serve Ventura, California, United States